Gorenflo is a Huguenot surname. Notable people with the surname include:

Kaye Gorenflo Hearn, American judge
Rudolf Gorenflo (1930–2017), German mathematician

See also
Colliflower

References

German-language surnames